EMISAT, launched on 1 April 2019, is an Indian reconnaissance satellite under Defence Research and Development Organisation (DRDO) project Kautilya which is a package that provides space-based electronic signal intelligence or ELINT. The spacecraft helps in improving the situational awareness of the Indian Armed Forces as it will provide information and location of enemy radars. The ELINT payload is developed by Defence Electronics Research Laboratory (DLRL), while augmented Indian Mini Satellite-2 (IMS-2) platform is provided by Indian Space Research Organisation (ISRO). The capabilities of the Kautilya package is highly classified. It monitors radio signals to determine the location and source of all transmission.

See also

 Indian military satellites
Indian Space Research Organisation
List of Indian satellites

References

Signals intelligence satellites
Satellites of India
Spacecraft launched by India in 2019
Spacecraft launched by PSLV rockets
April 2019 events in India
Military equipment introduced in the 2010s